The 2020 Burnie International was a professional tennis tournament played on outdoor hard courts. It was the seventeenth (men) and eleventh (women) editions of the tournament which was part of the 2020 ATP Challenger Tour and the 2020 ITF Women's World Tennis Tour. It took place in Burnie, Australia between 27 January and 2 February 2020.

Men's singles main-draw entrants

Seeds

 1 Rankings are as of 20 January 2020.

Other entrants
The following players received wildcards into the singles main draw:
  Alexander Crnokrak
  Blake Ellis
  Matthew Romios
  Tristan Schoolkate
  Dane Sweeny

The following player received entry into the singles main draw as an alternate:
  Liam Caruana

The following players received entry from the qualifying draw:
  Takuto Niki
  Petros Tsitsipas

Women's singles main-draw entrants

Seeds

 1 Rankings are as of 20 January 2020.

Other entrants
The following players received wildcards into the singles main draw:
  Isabella Bozicevic
  Alexandra Bozovic
  Ellen Perez
  Ivana Popovic

The following players received entry from the qualifying draw:
  Mana Ayukawa
  Gabriella Da Silva-Fick
  Nagi Hanatani
  Mai Hontama
  Paige Hourigan
  Amber Marshall
  Irina Ramialison
  Himari Sato

The following player received entry as a lucky loser:
  Erin Routliffe

Champions

Men's singles

 Taro Daniel def.  Yannick Hanfmann 6–2, 6–2.

Women's singles

 Maddison Inglis def.  Sachia Vickery, 2–6, 6–3, 7–5

Men's doubles

 Harri Heliövaara /  Sem Verbeek def.  Luca Margaroli /  Andrea Vavassori 7–6(7–5), 7–6(7–4).

Women's doubles

 Ellen Perez /  Storm Sanders def.  Desirae Krawczyk /  Asia Muhammad, 6–3, 6–2

References

External links
 2020 Burnie International at ITFtennis.com
 Official website

2020 ATP Challenger Tour
2020 ITF Women's World Tennis Tour
2020 in Australian tennis
January 2020 sports events in Australia
February 2020 sports events in Australia